Bisson is a surname, and may refer to:

Alexandre Bisson (1848–1912), French playwright and novelist
Auguste-Rosalie Bisson (1826–1900), French photographer, brother of Louis-Auguste Bisson
Baptiste Pierre Bisson (1767–1811), French general of the Napoleonic Wars 
Chris Bisson (bornn 1975), British actor
Christophe Bisson, international film director 
Claude Bisson (born 1931), retired Canadian judge
Corey Bisson (born 1993), American cricketer 
Élie-Hercule Bisson (1833–1907), Canadian notary and political figure in Quebec
Federico Bisson (born 1936), Italian former triple jumper
Fernand Bisson de la Roque (1885-1958), French Egyptologist and archaeologist
Frédérique Vallet-Bisson (1862–1949), French painter
Gilles Bisson (born 1957), Canadian politician
Gordon Bisson (1918-2010),  New Zealand Court of Appeal judge and a member of the Privy Council of the United Kingdom
Ivan Bisson (born 1946), Italian basketball player
Karina Bisson (born 1966), American international lawn and indoor bowler 
Linda Bisson, American rained yeast geneticist who focuses on sugar catabolism and fermentation
Louis-Auguste Bisson (1814–1876), French photographer, brother of Auguste-Rosalie Bisson
Louis Bisson (1909-197), Canadian aviator 
Lucienne Bisson (1880–1939), French artist
Raoul du Bisson (fl. 1863–65), French nobleman and adventurer in the Sudan
Sandrine Bisson (born 1975), Canadian actress
Terry Bisson (born 1942), American science fiction and fantasy author
Thomas Arthur Bisson (1900–1979), American political writer, journalist, and government official
Yannick Bisson (born 1969), Canadian film and television actor

See also
 Bissonnette
 Bissonnet